The chief minister of Nagaland is the chief executive of the Indian state of Nagaland. As per the Constitution of India, the governor is a state's de jure head, but de facto executive authority rests with the chief minister. Following elections to the Nagaland Legislative Assembly, the state's governor usually invites the party (or coalition) with a majority of seats to form the government. The governor appoints the chief minister, whose council of ministers are collectively responsible to the assembly. Given that he has the confidence of the assembly, the chief minister's term is for five years and is subject to no term limits.

Since 1963, eleven people belonging to seven parties have served as Chief Minister of Nagaland. The first three belonged to the Nagaland Nationalist Organisation, including the inaugural officeholder P. Shilu Ao. The current incumbent is Neiphiu Rio of the Nationalist Democratic Progressive Party, in office since 8 March 2018.

List

Timeline

Notes
Footnotes

References

External links
 States of India since 1947

Nagaland
 
Chief Ministers